Andriy Yatsenko (born 7 May 1973) is a Ukrainian cyclist. He competed in two events at the 1996 Summer Olympics.

References

1973 births
Living people
Ukrainian male cyclists
Olympic cyclists of Ukraine
Cyclists at the 1996 Summer Olympics
Place of birth missing (living people)